Jonathan "Johnny" Nave is a former NASCAR Grand National Series driver who has raced in 242 laps - the equivalent of  – while earning a grand total of $520 ($ when adjusted for inflation).

Career
Nave would suffer from a 15th-place finish after the end of an untitled race in 1958 involving only 18 drivers; including Buck Baker, Marvin Panch, and Speedy Thompson.

His average starting position was 25th while his average finishing position was 28th. Nave's primary vehicle is the #39 Ford machine; although he made use of the numbers #561 and #79 from time to time. Racing vehicles were either owned by himself or by Robert Ramey.

References

External links
 

Year of birth missing (living people)
Living people
NASCAR drivers
People from Jonesboro, Georgia
Racing drivers from Atlanta
Racing drivers from Georgia (U.S. state)
Sportspeople from the Atlanta metropolitan area